David Bernard Patterson Jr (born February 11, 1985) is a former American and Canadian football defensive tackle. He was signed by the Falcons in 2007. He played college football at  Ohio State University.  He played his high school football at Warrensville Heights High School in Warrensville Heights, Ohio, under head coach Dan Thorpe.

Patterson married the model Anansa Sims and the two appeared together on the reality television series Beverly's Full House on the Oprah Winfrey Network.

1985 births
Living people
Players of Canadian football from Cleveland
American football defensive tackles
Ohio State Buckeyes football players
Atlanta Falcons players
Saskatchewan Roughriders players
Players of American football from Cleveland